Pagurapseudopsis is a genus of crustaceans in the family Pagurapseudidae, containing the following species:
Pagurapseudopsis carinata (Bacescu, 1981)
Pagurapseudopsis gracilipes Shiino, 1963
Pagurapseudopsis gymnophobia (Barnard, 1935)
Pagurapseudopsis iranica Bacescu, 1978
Pagurapseudopsis thailandica Angsupanich, 2001

References

Tanaidacea